Wilmer Amina Carter (born July 19, 1941) is an American politician who served in the California State Assembly. She is a Democrat.

Pre-legislative career and personal
Wilmer Amina Carter comes from a large, extended family and spent her childhood years on a farm in Mississippi before moving to San Bernardino.

Carter served 16 years on the Rialto Board of Education from 1983 through 1999. For 23 years from 1973 until 1996, she was a staff member for Congressman George Brown, Jr. One of her jobs was District director. She also coordinated legislative and community relations for Cal State San Bernardino.

A high school in Rialto is named after her. Wilmer Amina Carter High School is the first high school in the Inland Empire named after a living African-American woman.

Assembly member Carter graduated from San Bernardino High School and San Bernardino Valley College, and earned a bachelor's degree in English and a master's degree in education from California State University, San Bernardino.

Legislative history
During her tenure, Assembly Member Carter has created, co-authored and supported laws that improve health, safety, transportation, jobs, housing and education for the citizens of the 62nd District and California.

References

External links
 "Full Biography for Wilmer Amina Carter, Candidate for Member of the State Assembly; District 62". San Bernardino County, CA, November 2, 2010 Election.
 Join California Wilmer Amina Carter

1941 births
African-American state legislators in California
African-American women in politics
California State University, San Bernardino alumni
Living people
Members of the California State Assembly
People from Neshoba County, Mississippi
People from Rialto, California
Women state legislators in California
21st-century American politicians
21st-century American women politicians
San Bernardino Valley College alumni
21st-century African-American women
21st-century African-American politicians
20th-century African-American people
20th-century African-American women